Founded in , the Malmö Art Museum is one of the leading art museums in Scandinavia. The museum is governed by the City of Malmö.

The collections
The museum houses a major collections of Nordic modern and contemporary art, now containing about 40,000 works, covering the period from the 16th century to the present day.

The museum hosts several important collections and historical donations, including the works of Carl Fredrik Hill (1849–1911). The Herman Gotthardt Collection of Nordic modern 20th-century art is an   important contribution to the understanding of the early production of Scandinavian modern art. Also in the museum's holdings is a unique collection of Russian fin-de-siècle paintings, acquired at the famous Baltic Exhibition in Malmö in 1914.

The museum  has an extensive collection of furniture and handicraft, primarily from southern Sweden.

Exhibitions
The permanent exhibition "From 1500 until Now" shows the historical development and the great variety in Sweden and north Europe of painting, sculpture and applied arts from the Renaissance through to Art Nouveau and up to the present day. It displays a selection of the finest artworks from the collection and interiors from the different periods of style.

References

External links
 Stay.com
 Theft of Munch painting
 NYTimes: Drawings from the Malmo Art Museum
 Frieze Magazine: Lukas Duwenhögger         
 Malmö Art Museum
Malmö Art Museum within Google Arts & Culture

Art museums and galleries in Sweden
Buildings and structures in Malmö
Museums in Skåne County
Tourist attractions in Malmö
19th-century establishments in Skåne County